Upper Lockyer is a rural locality in the Lockyer Valley Region, Queensland, Australia.

History 
Lockyer Upper State School (also known as Upper Lockyer State School) opened on 3 July 1939. It closed on 27 September 1968. It was on the western side of Murphys Creek Road at the junction with Lockyer Siding Road, now within the locality boundaries of Lockyer.

Education 
There are no schools in Upper Lockyer. The nearest government primary school is Murphy's Creek State School in neighbouring Murphys Creek to the north-west. The nearest government secondary schools are Toowoomba State High School in Mount Lofty to the south-west and Centenary Heights State High School in Centenary Heights, also to the south-west.

Community groups 
The Upper Lockyer Withcott branch of the Queensland Country Women's Association meets at 4 Biggs Road, Withcott.

References 

Lockyer Valley Region
Localities in Queensland